Caifanes is the debut studio album by Mexican rock band Caifanes. It was released in 1988 after the success of their first singles, "Mátenme porque me muero" and "La bestia humana". The original release of the album did not contain the songs "La negra Tomasa" and "Perdí mi ojo de venado", which were released in 1989 as singles and later incorporated into the album when it was re-released on compact disc in 1993. It is undergoing a re-pressing process as of March 2011.

The LP is also referred to as Volumen 1 or Mátenme porque me muero.

Track listing

Personnel

Caifanes
Saul Hernandez – vocals, guitar (except on "La bestia humana")
Alfonso Andre – drums, miscellaneous percussion
Sabo Romo – bass
Diego Herrera – keyboards, saxophone

Additional musicians
Gustavo Cerati – guitar on "La bestia humana"
Cachorro Lopez – stick on "Nada"

Certifications

Notes

1988 debut albums
Caifanes albums